Raymond & Ray is a 2022 comedy-drama film written and directed by Rodrigo García. The film stars Ewan McGregor, Ethan Hawke, Maribel Verdú, and Sophie Okonedo.

Raymond & Ray had its world premiere at the 2022 Toronto International Film Festival on September 12, 2022, and was released in select cinemas on October 14, 2022, before its streaming release on October 21, 2022, by Apple TV+.

Plot
Raymond drives on a late, rainy night to a remote cabin to inform his half-brother, Ray, that their father, Ben Harris, has passed away and wished that all his sons attend his funeral. Ray is at first reluctant to go, but due to Raymond losing his license because of a DUI and some persuading, Ray finally agrees to attend. The brothers haven't seen each other in nearly five years because of the abuse their father inflicted on them during childhood, leaving them to with different trauma plaguing their adult life, with Raymond having unsuccessful relationships with the women in his life, while Ray was a former heroin addict, but has been sober for several years.

Cast
 Ewan McGregor as Raymond
 Ethan Hawke as Ray
 Maribel Verdú as Lucia
 Sophie Okonedo as Kiera
 Maxim Swinton as Simon
 Vondie Curtis-Hall as Reverend West
 Chris Silcox as Leon
 Chris Grabher as Vincent
 Oscar Nunez as Mendez

Production
It was announced in August 2021 that Ewan McGregor and Ethan Hawke had been cast to star in the film, which is written and directed by Rodrigo García. In October, Maribel Verdú and Sophie Okonedo were added to the cast, with Maxim Swinton joining the next month.

Virginia governor Ralph Northam announced in September 2021 that the film would shoot in Central Virginia beginning in the fall. Filming began in Richmond the following month. Filming took place in Hopewell, Virginia from October 18 to 21. Filming took place at Oakwood Cemetery in Richmond in November.

Jeff Beal composed the film's score.

Release
It had its world premiere at the 2022 Toronto International Film Festival on September 12, 2022. It also made it to 'World Cinema' section of 27th Busan International Film Festival to be screened on October 7, 2022.

Critical reception
 On Metacritic, the film has a weighted average score of 49 out of 100, based on 22 critics, indicating "mixed or average reviews".

References

External links

2022 films
2022 comedy-drama films
2020s American films
2020s English-language films
American comedy-drama films
Apple TV+ original films
Films about brothers
Films about funerals
Films directed by Rodrigo García
Films produced by Alfonso Cuarón
Films produced by Bonnie Curtis
Films scored by Jeff Beal
Films shot in Virginia